Ek Thi Reeta (A Girl Called Reeta) is a 1971 Bollywood action comedy thriller, produced and directed by Roop K. Shorey. The film was an adaptation of Shorey's earlier success Ek Thi Ladki (1949), which starred his wife actress Meena Shorey and Motilal.  The original owed its "popularity" more to the music of the film, especially the song "Larra Lappa" composed by music director Vinod.

In Ek Thi Reeta, Shorey tried to repeat the success of Ek Thi Ladki by using the same story. However, according to Narwekar, in his book, Eena Meena Deeka: The History of Hindi Film Comedy, the "formula" did not work and the film was not a success commercially. The film had music by Jaidev and starred Vinod Mehra, Tanuja and I. S. Johar in lead roles with Lolita Chatterjee, Rehman, Faryal and Manmohan Krishna forming the ensemble cast.

The film involved a young girl called Reeta who believes herself to be an orphan. Implicated on a false murder charge she escapes, only to get involved in several comedic situations along with the film's hero.

Cast 
 Vinod Mehra 
 Tanuja
 Rehman
 I. S. Johar
 Daisy Irani
 Lolita Chatterjee
 Manmohan Krishna 
 Mona Malik
 Pompi

Music 

The musical score for the film was composed by Jaidev Verma. The lyrics were written by 	Sarshar Sailani, Vikal Saketi, Prem Jalandhari, Naqsh Lyallpuri and Anjaan.

References

External links

1971 films
1970s Hindi-language films
Films scored by Jaidev